Sercial is the name of a white grape grown in Portugal, especially on the island of Madeira. It has given name to the dryest of the four classic varieties of Madeira fortified wine.

The grape is grown in diminishing quantities at the southern end of the island. After phylloxera devastated Madeira's vineyards, the grape became more common on the mainland, where it is known as Esgana or Esgana Cão, meaning respectively Strangler or Dog Strangler. Its late ripening allows it to retain its characteristic acidity.

The anglicised name Sercial came to be associated with the Madeira style rather than the grape variety, being the lightest, most acidic and delicate expression of Madeira that takes the longest to mature. EU rules for varietal names on wine labels now require Madeiras labelled Sercial to be made from minimum 85% Sercial.

For obscure reasons, Sercial was the name given to the Gascony grape Ondenc when it was planted in Australia.

See also
List of Portuguese grape varieties

References

White wine grape varieties
Madeira wine